WHFA (1240 AM) is a radio station licensed to Poynette, Wisconsin, United States.  The station serves the Madison area. It broadcasts a Catholic format. The station is owned by Relevant Radio, Inc. WHFA previously had the call letters WIBU. The station is an affiliate of Relevant Radio.

The station was founded in 1925 by William C. Forrest as WIBU. Forrest is regarded as an early pioneer of Wisconsin broadcasting. The sequentially assigned call letters of WIBU were quickly adopted to mean "Wind Is Being Used" or "Wind Is Behind Us" as Forrest utilized windmills to generate electricity for the station. The station's studios were housed in a streamlined art-modern style building located on N2349 WIBU Road in Poynette.Veteran Wisconsin Public Radio announcer Jim Packard, announcer of Whad’Ya Know?, was among WIBU alums.

In the spring of 1988, WIBU gained national notoriety in national media as it adopted an all polka format, which lasted until 1991. In 1999 the format changed to Music of Your Life. WIBU was sold to Starboard Broadcasting in 2001 and became WHFA, carrying Starboard's Catholic religious format, branded Relevant Radio.

References

External links

Radio stations established in 1925
Relevant Radio stations
HFA
Catholic Church in Wisconsin
Columbia County, Wisconsin